CFR Title 37 - Patents, Trademarks, and Copyrights is one of fifty titles comprising the United States Code of Federal Regulations (CFR). Title 37 is the principal set of rules and regulations  issued by federal agencies of the United States regarding patents, trademarks, and copyrights. It is available in digital and printed form, and can be referenced online using the Electronic Code of Federal Regulations (e-CFR).

Structure 

The table of contents, as reflected in the e-CFR updated February 21, 2014, is as follows:

 37